Rob Tregenza (born November 14, 1950) is a North American cinematographer, film director, and producer who has worked as a director of photography with other directors, including Béla Tarr (Werckmeister Harmonies), Claude Miller (Marching Band), Pierre William Glenn (The Sad and Lonely Death of Edgar Allan Poe), and Alex Cox (Three Businessmen).

Early work 
A native of Kansas, Tregenza earned his PhD in theater arts from the University of California, Los Angeles in 1982. In the following years, he would continue to make experimental films out of his Sykesville, Maryland studio, financially supporting his work by making advertisements and industrial films with wife and producer J.K. Eareckson. Tregenza eventually made his feature film debut, Talking to Strangers, which premiered in 1988 to great acclaim. Since then, he has produced, directed and photographed three more feature films: The Arc (1991), a co-production with Film Four International, Inside/Out (1997), and Gavagai (2016).

Talking to Strangers won him the praise of Jean-Luc Godard, who subsequently helped Tregenza make Inside/Out. Richard Brody, of The New Yorker, wrote of the main character, Jesse, in the film: "The drive for [his] purity extends through all domains—intimate, intellectual, artistic, and, for that matter, religious—as the quest for experience comes into conflict with the yearning for the realization of a higher, even transcendently great, ideal".

Tregenza's third feature, Inside/Out, premiered at the 1997 Cannes Film Festival in the Un Certain Regard section.

In 1999, a retrospective of his feature films was shown at the National Gallery of Art in Washington, D.C.

Tregenza's fourth feature film, Gavagai (2016) was shot in 35mm, in Telemark, Norway.
It stars Andreas Lust (The Robber 2010, Revanche 2008), Anni-Kristiina Juuso (The Cuckoo 2009) and Mikkel Gaup (Kautokeino Rebellion 2008) GAVAGAI was based on 15 poems by Tarjei Vesaas.  It was distributed theatrically in North America by Shadow Distribution and was sixth in Metacritic's list of the best-reviewed feature films distributed in 2018.

Cinematic technique 
Tregenza's work often employs the use of long takes to create mise en scene. His cinematic inspirations include the works of Michelangelo Antonioni, Kenji Mizoguchi, & Jean-Luc Godard. He believes that cinema, in the words of Godard, is "reality walking hand in hand with fiction."

References

External links

1950 births
Living people
American filmmakers
American cinematographers